Henry, Margrave of Hachberg-Sausenberg (1300-1318) was the son of Margrave Rudolf I of Hachberg-Sausenberg and his wife Agnes, who was the daughter and heiress of Otto of Rötteln.  In 1312, when he was still a minor, he inherited his father's possessions.  After he came of age in 1315, his uncle Lüthold II of Röttlen gave him the Lordship of Rötteln.  Lüthold II died in 1316.

Henry died young, in 1318, at the age of 18.  After his death, his younger brothers Rudolf II and Otto took up the reign of the Lordships Rötteln and Sausenberg.

See also 
 Margraviate of Baden
 List of rulers of Baden

References 

 Fritz Schülin: Rötteln-Haagen, Beiträge zur Orts-, Landschafts- und Siedlungsgeschichte, Lörrach, 1965, p. 65
 Karl Seith: Die Burg Rötteln im Wandel ihrer Herrengeschlechter, Ein Beitrag zur Geschichte und Baugeschichte der Burg, Röttelbund e.V., Haagen, p. 6; cited by Schülin as "in: Markgräflerland, vol. 3, issue 1, 1931"

Margraves of Baden-Hachberg
1300 births
1318 deaths
14th-century German nobility